James Riley may refer to:

 James Riley (captain) (1777–1840), captain of the American merchant ship Commerce
 James Riley (cricketer) (1860–1937), English cricketer
 James Riley (footballer) (1880–1938), English association footballer
 James Riley (gunman) (1853–?), American gunfighter
 James Riley (soccer) (born 1982), American soccer player
 James Frederic Riley (1912–1985), British physician, radiologist and cancer specialist
 James J. Riley, American mechanical engineer
 James M. Riley, better known as Doc Middleton (1851–1913), outlaw and horse thief
 James M. Riley (politician), (1854-1913), New York politician
 James McIlvaine Riley (1849–1911), co-founder of the Sigma Nu fraternity
 James W. Riley (1875–1954), New York politician
 James Whitcomb Riley (1849–1916), American writer and poet
 James Riley (born c. 1972), American soldier captured in Iraq, see American POWs in the 2003 invasion of Iraq
 James Riley (writer) (born c. 1977), American author
 James B. Riley, West Virginia judge
 Jack Riley (baseball) (James Riley), American baseball player

See also
 Jim Riley (disambiguation)
 James Reilly (disambiguation)
 James Whitcomb Riley (train)
 James Whitcomb Riley Hospital for Children, a children's hospital in Indianapolis, Indiana
 James Whitcomb Riley High School, a secondary school in South Bend, Indiana